Koovee ry, stylized as KOOVEE ry, is a Finnish ice hockey team based at Tampere. They currently play in the Mestis, the second-tier league of Finland.

Koovee played in the country's top-tier leagues, SM-sarja and SM-liiga in the 1950–51 season, then 1953 to 1957 and again from 1958 until 1980.

The team were initially named Tampereen Kilpa-Veljet ry (TK-V) until 1967.

Koovee play in Tampere at the Hakametsä 2 arena which holds about 800 persons.

See also 
Koovee sport club
Ilves
Tappara

Ice hockey teams in Finland
Mestis teams
Former Liiga teams
Sport in Tampere
1929 establishments in Finland